Bonehead (also known as Familiar 48) is an American alternative rock band, best known for their US radio hit, "The Question".

History
Bonehead was formed in 1994 by Stone Groove Productions as a Philadelphia area nightclub cover band.  A trademark of the band was during sets a group of die hard Bonehead fans would do different pro wrestling gestures usually getting a response from Scott.  By 1997, the band released an EP of original music, entitled "Bonehead".  This EP was mainly available for purchase at the band's live performances & sold well enough to justify a follow-up effort.  Their next release was a CD single for the song "I Know" in 1998 on Vulgar Entertainment; their first LP was 1999's Fade, also released on Vulgar. After discovering that the name "Bonehead" was very similar to another band with national aspirations, the band changed names in 2000 to Familiar 48. Producer Don Gehman, expressing interest in the band's debut album, got them signed to Refuge Records, a subsidiary of MCA Records and produced their major-label debut, Wonderful Nothing. The album was released in April 2002, with the lead single "Learn to Love Again"; this song failed to chart, but a later single, "The Question", experienced minor chart success in the United States. Mannon broke the band up in 2003, and began recording songs in hopes of putting together a solo project, but this never materialized.

In 2005, Mannon announced a reformulation of the band under the old name, and the next year yielded a re-press of Fade with four extra bonus tracks. In 2007, Jayy Mannon announced that Bonehead would release a new album containing much of the work he wrote as a solo artist, entitled Broken and Glued. Since then Bonehead has remained primarily a regional draw, playing in the Philadelphia area mostly as a cover band. In 2011 Bonehead released its first new music in four years, a digital single entitled "Real".

Members
Current Members
Jayy Mannon - guitar, lead & backing vocals, drums
Jeff Camarco - bass
Daryl Updike - drums
Kevin Hug - guitars, bass

Former Members
Rick Dean Smith - guitars, vocals
Dave Poole - guitars, vocals
Walt Sarkees - guitars, vocals
Jeffery Beck - keyboards, vocals
Chris Martin - guitars, vocals
Pat Callahan - guitars
Mike Arellano - guitars, vocals
Nick Denofa - drums
Scott Pustilnick (aka Scott Stanley) - bass

Discography
Bonehead EP (1997)
I Know CD-Single (Vulgar, 1998)
Fade (Vulgar, 1999)
reissued in 2006 by Vulgar
Wonderful Nothing (as Familiar 48) (MCA, 2002)
Broken and Glued (Vulgar, 2007)

Charting singles

References

External links
Official Website
Bonehead at MySpace
Familiar 48 at MySpace

Musical groups from Philadelphia
American post-grunge musical groups